Carpenter is a lunar impact crater in the northern part of the Moon, relatively close to the limb (as viewed from earth). At this position the crater is foreshortened and appears oval in shape. It is, however, very nearly circular in outline. The outer rampart to the south is adjoined to the old crater Anaximander, and the satellite formation Anaximander B lies along the western rim. To the northeast is Anaximenes.

In geological terms Carpenter is a somewhat young lunar crater, with features that have not been significantly eroded by subsequent impacts. Certainly it is much younger than the surrounding crater formations. The inner wall displays an appearance of slumping, particularly along the eastern face, and there is some development of terraces. The outer rim is unmarked by craterlets of note, but there is a small crater along the south-southeastern inner wall.  The crater has a ray system, and is consequently mapped as part of the Copernican System.

The interior floor within the sloping inner walls is generally level, but irregular with many small bumps and hills. Near the midpoint is an unusual double central peak formation, with a smaller peak offset to the west and a larger ridge offset to the east. The latter ridge runs southward to the edge of the inner wall.

Satellite craters
By convention these features are identified on lunar maps by placing the letter on the side of the crater midpoint that is closest to Carpenter.

References

 
 
 
 
 
 
 
 
 
 
 
 

Impact craters on the Moon